The King's Musketeers is a 2018 Italian comedy film directed by Giovanni Veronesi, loosely based on the Alexandre Dumas's novels The Three Musketeers and Twenty Years After.

Cast
Pierfrancesco Favino as D'Artagnan
Rocco Papaleo as Athos
Valerio Mastandrea as Porthos
Sergio Rubini as Aramis
Margherita Buy as Queen Anne
Alessandro Haber as Cardinal Mazarin
Marco Todisco as King Louis XIV
Matilde Gioli as the servant
Federico Ielapi as Antonio
Valeria Solarino as Cicognac
Giulia Bevilacqua as Milady

Sequel
In 2020, a sequel entitled Tutti per uno, uno per tutti ("All for one, one for all!") was announced; filming began in Tuscany on 21 August 2020. Due to the COVID-19 pandemic, the sequel was directly released on Sky Cinema on 25 December 2020.

References

External links

2018 films
Films directed by Giovanni Veronesi
2010s Italian-language films
2018 comedy films
Italian comedy films
Cultural depictions of Louis XIV
Cultural depictions of Cardinal Mazarin
Films based on The Three Musketeers
Films based on Twenty Years After
2010s Italian films